Shri Banwari Lal Kanchhal a politician from Samajwadi Party is a Member of the Parliament of India representing Uttar Pradesh in the Rajya Sabha, the upper house of the Indian Parliament. He was elected for the term 2006-2012 butresigned in 2009 after joining BSP.

References

External links
 Profile on Rajya Sabha website

Samajwadi Party politicians
Rajya Sabha members from Uttar Pradesh
Living people
Year of birth missing (living people)
Samajwadi Party politicians from Uttar Pradesh